"The Vicar of Bray" is an eighteenth century satirical song recounting the career of The Vicar of Bray and his contortions of principle in order to retain his ecclesiastic office despite the changes in the Established Church through the course of several English monarchs. The song is particularly interesting because of the number of (rather specific) allusions to English religious and political doctrines and events crammed into it, justifying the close reading and annotation given here.

Origins and cultural influence
The generally known form of the song appears to have been based on an earlier version, "The Religious Turncoat; Or, the Trimming Parson".

The melody is taken from the 17th-century folk melody "Country Gardens" which in turn was used in The Quaker's Opera, first printed in London in 1728, a three-act farce based on the story of Jack Sheppard which was performed at Bartholomew Fair.

A parody of this parody song, "The American Vicar of Bray", with the same chorus, was published in the 30 June 1779 edition of Rivington's Royal Gazette, mocking the shifting loyalties of some American colonists during the American Revolutionary War.

"The Vicar of Bray" is also referenced in the song "Parlour Songs" in the Stephen Sondheim musical, Sweeney Todd, although the song has been removed from more recent performances of that musical.

Text and melody

In good King Charles's golden days,
When Loyalty no harm meant;
A Zealous High-Church man I was,1
And so I gain'd Preferment.2
Unto my Flock I daily Preach'd,
Kings are by God appointed,
And Damn'd are those who dare resist,3
Or touch the Lord's Anointed.4
And this is law,5 I will maintain
Unto my Dying Day, Sir.
That whatsoever King may reign,
I will be the Vicar of Bray, Sir!

When Royal James possest the crown,
And popery6 grew in fashion;
The Penal Law I shouted down,
And read the Declaration:7
The Church of Rome I found would fit
Full well my Constitution,
And I had been a Jesuit,8
But for the Revolution.9
And this is law, &c.

When William our Deliverer came,
To heal the Nation's Grievance,
I turn'd the Cat in Pan10 again,
And swore to him Allegiance:11
Old Principles I did revoke,
Set conscience at a distance,
Passive Obedience is a Joke,
A Jest is12 non-resistance.13
And this is law, &c.

When Royal Anne became our Queen,
Then Church of England's Glory,
Another face of things was seen,
And I became a Tory:14
Occasional Conformists base
I Damn'd, and Moderation,
And thought the Church in danger was,
From such Prevarication.
And this is law, &c.

And Moderate Men looked big, Sir,
My Principles I chang'd once more,
And so became a Whig, Sir.16
And thus Preferment I ,
From our Faith's great Defender17
And almost every day abjur'd
The Pope, and the Pretender.
And this is law, &c.

The Illustrious House of Hanover,18
And Protestant succession,
To these I lustily will swear,
Whilst they can keep possession:
For in my Faith, and Loyalty,
I never once will faulter,
But George, my lawful king shall be,
Except the Times shou'd alter.
And this is law, &c.

Notes

High Church
The division of the English church into "high" and "low" was extremely significant at the time of the Restoration. The High Church resisted the Calvinistic levelling of church hierarchy that had been seen in the Commonwealth. The High Church party supported the divine right of kings, episcopal church government, and establishment of the Church of England by the civil government. It was primarily Tory, and was more hierarchical than either the "low" (more Puritan/Presbyterian) or "broad" (latitudinarian or tolerant) churches. High Church in the late 17th century should not be confused with the liturgical changes sought by the Anglo-Catholic/Oxford Movement in the 19th century. Puritans, Presbyterians and Baptists favoured plainer, less sacramental, more scriptural liturgy in every era. However restoration of the Catholic style liturgy (often called 'High Church') in the Church of England is primarily a 19th-century phenomenon. In the 17th century, the High Church was devoted to the King's church: meaning that the King of England was not only the head of the church, but that the church's very holiness was imbued into the King's person. Therefore, the King of England was not, in some sense, an ordinary mortal.

The Vicar of Bray comically adapts his political and ecclesiastical beliefs to fit the successively ascendant government and church parties of his day.

Preferment
Appointment to an ecclesiastical office, or the position itself; in this case the benefice of Bray. A candidate for an ecclesiastical position was "preferred" over others for it by those with the right of appointment: these could be church superiors, or often nobles or institutions such as Oxbridge colleges (through their right to present a new incumbent to a benefice).

Those who dare resist
A reference to Oliver Cromwell and the regicides who tried and executed Charles I.

Lord's Anointed
In this case, the King, anointed (by God) in the ceremony of coronation as temporal and spiritual leader of England; it draws from the Judeo-Christian Bible, I Samuel . King Charles I, who had been beheaded during the English Civil War had attempted to introduce the doctrine of Divine Right of Kings to England. After the rule of Oliver Cromwell, Charles II (son of Charles I) was restored to the throne. Charles II was more moderate than his father, but the leading political theorist of the absolutist side, Sir Robert Filmer (the target of John Locke's Two Treatises of Government), had argued that the king is appointed directly by God and is, by nature, inherently superior to those he ruled. Therefore, the king is anointed by God from birth (and not by the Archbishop at coronation). Charles II took no consistent position on divine right, but those who restored him did, and the High Church was ascending.

Law
The English Church is an Established Church, meaning that it is regulated by Parliamentary law; at the time ecclesiastics could be and were removed from office for their religious and political opinions. This is the gist of the song's satire: the Vicar of Bray accommodated his beliefs to those of the current ruler, in order to retain his ecclesiastic office. During the period in question, one of the most difficult and fluid questions was the degree to which Non-conformist and Non-juror clerics could participate in the Established Church.

Non-conformists were those ministers who, though ordained and appointed by the church hierarchy, would not conform to the liturgical practices outlined by the church authorities. These individuals were usually Puritans of some variety, but they could include nearly any variation in religious practice.

Non-jurors (oath-refusers) were more vexing. When Parliament required that all clergy swear allegiance to the king as head of the church, many resisted. Some Puritans felt that no man could lead a church, that orders came from God directly to each believer. Others had sworn oaths before the Test Act and could not swear again without being forsworn. Others were of Roman Catholic leanings and did not recognise the king's reformed church's right to separation from the rest of the communion. In particular, it would be inconsistent to take the oath under Charles II (the Test Act of 1673) and also to take the oath under William III and Mary II, as these two oaths were contradictory. Not taking the new oaths was a matter of derision, as those parsons were regarded as possibly seditious, and taking the new oaths was a matter of derision, as those parsons were regarded as spineless. The Vicar of Bray is in the latter camp.

Popery
Derogatory word referring to Roman Catholicism, as personified in the Pope; King James II was the first Catholic monarch of England since Mary I of England. James's Catholic faith and attempts to revoke legal restrictions against his coreligionists caused an anti-Catholic Parliament to invite King James' daughter, Mary, and her husband, James' nephew and son-in-law William of Orange, to rule England. William invaded England with a large army. Parliament announced that the King had effectively abdicated and declared William III and Mary II to be joint King and Queen. This coup d'etat was a unique event in British history, and is known as the Glorious Revolution. Parliament passed legislation making Protestantism a condition for any monarch of Britain or Ireland.

Even after the defeat of his armies in Ireland, King James and the House of Stuart still had a very large following throughout the British Isles. The new order never felt entirely secure from the possibility of civil war in favor of the deposed dynasty.

James's son, living abroad, became known as The Old Pretender (see line 41), but his grandson, Charles ("Bonnie Prince Charlie"), The Young Pretender, proved a far more effective military commander and contender for the throne.

Penal Laws and Declaration of Indulgence

The Penal Laws were a series of laws which upheld the establishment of the Church of England against Protestant nonconformists and Catholics. Civil penalties were applied to those who did not conform. When James II of England and VII of Scotland he issued two proclamations in 1687 (12 February in Scotland and 4 April in England) granted broad religious freedom by suspending the penal laws. There was open resistance from Anglicans and few clergy read out the indulgence in Church. The Vicar of Bray was therefore following the King rather than the Church.

Jesuits
A Roman Catholic religious order founded by Saint Ignatius of Loyola, the Jesuits were known for the excellence of their academic training, ability to argue effectively against Protestantism using the Bible, and personal vow of obedience to the Roman Pontiff. Therefore, from the reign of Queen Elizabeth I of England the priests of Society of Jesus were especially feared and hated by the Protestants of the British Isles. English, Scottish, Irish, and Welsh Protestants viewed the Jesuits as terrorists, assassins, and spies due to the Jesuit practice of sending missionaries incognito into Britain to minister to Catholics, spread the faith and bring back information. It was alleged (based on both hearsay and the convictions of Jesuits for involvement in the Gunpowder Plot (1605)) that the order incited revolt.

Glorious Revolution
The Glorious Revolution occurred soon after James II's ascension to the throne in 1685. James had only been king for a matter three years before he fled. The Vicar, therefore, did not have long with his new faith. However, the Vicar was not alone in converting to open Roman Catholicism. John Dryden became Roman Catholic at this time (and was taunted by a version of the "Vicar of Bray" tale pre-dating this song), but he remained Roman Catholic to his death and defended his conversion publicly.

Turn'd the cat in pan
To change sides quickly and effortlessly. According to the Oxford English Dictionary: "to reverse the order of things so dexterously as to make them appear the very opposite of what they really are; to turn a thing right about. Obs.".

Allegiance
When William & Mary came to the throne many Anglican clergy felt still bound by their previous oaths of allegiance to James II. They would accept William & Mary as regents, but not as the rightful monarchs so could not swear an oath of allegiance to them. They became known as the nonjurors from the Latin  meaning to "swear an oath". The schism slowly declined throughout the 18th century.

"Jest is"
Some versions of the song give this as "a pish on" ("a piss on").

Passive obedience and non-resistance

Passive obedience is the doctrine espoused by Bishop Berkeley in 1712 that people have "a moral duty to observe the negative precepts (prohibitions) of the law, including the duty not to resist the execution of punishment". Although Berkeley made exceptions to this the exceptions did not cover tyranny, and therefore would not have excuse revoking "old principles" and changing allegiance. Bray clearly thinks this is "a joke".

The term nonresistance was used to refer to the Established Church during the religious troubles in England following the English Civil War and Protestant Succession. It is "the practice or principle of not resisting authority, even when it is unjustly exercised". Bray wishes to be seen as embracing enthusiastically the new order regardless of previous oaths.

Tory
Queen Anne's first government was Whig, but the Tories rose soon to negotiate the Treaty of Utrecht to end the Whig War of the Spanish Succession. During this period, several men of great force rose under the leadership of Robert Harley, 1st Earl of Oxford and Earl Mortimer, and Henry St. John, the Viscount Bolingbroke. This is notable, because the voices of this Tory administration (including Alexander Pope and Jonathan Swift) were adept satirists, and the "Vicar of Bray" was composed, most likely, by a sympathetic wit.

The idea that the Church was in danger (lines 32–33) was a common rallying cry of the Tory churchmen from 1701 onward. The danger was from Puritans, for the most part. The Vicar's previous beliefs were of reforming, then alien sorts. (Alien meaning Catholic: a religion controlled not by Englishmen and ruled by an English monarch, but by the foreign Pope, who himself might be under the control of foreign monarchs.) But now the Vicar worries that the Church is under threat, and he is alarmed, specifically, at the 'lies' of those who are occasional conformists (i.e. persons whose obedience is partial and likely nominal, "occasioned" not by true belief but to avoid the civil disabilities of the Penal Laws).

Pudding Time
wiktionary:Pudding Time 

OED says: "The time when pudding or puddings are to be had; (hence fig.) a time when a person is in luck; a favourable or useful time". The OED entry cites this song as an example of the phrase's use.

Whig
George I's first government was Whig. In particular, George I's rule was the zenith of Robert Walpole, often called the first British Prime Minister. Walpole dominated all aspects of British politics and polarised the populace. Whigs monopolised power during the Walpole administration.

The Whigs generally prevailed during the Hanoverian reigns, with some notable exceptions. During this period, the Whigs were known as standing for religious tolerance and state sponsorship of trade. The Tories were the party of the aristocracy and the squires (the country estate holders). Tories accused the Whigs of taking Holland, which had become very wealthy with mercantilism and tolerance, as their model. The emergent foreign trade interests were favoured by George I, who himself came from modern-day Germany and tried to distance himself as much as possible from religious matters. His background was in a state with little monarchical control of religion, and this meant that his court was disengaged. The Vicar therefore embraces the occasional conformity that he previously thought a danger.

Faith's great Defender
The Latin title  was first granted by the Pope to King Henry VIII, who subsequently split the English Church from Rome; hence the double irony of the song applying it to Protestant King George. The line is even more ironic, since George I did not take stands on religious matters, preferring to practice salutary neglect of church matters. In fact, George II (king at the time of this song's setting) reduced the involvement of the Crown with the Church in general and diminished the role of Lords in church affairs. Thus, he seemed to contemporaries to be a more secular king than they had had before, and certainly not a "".

Hannover
This spelling is standard in German, but archaic in English; the modern English spelling is "Hanover".

Historical basis of the character
The parish referred to in the song is Bray, Berkshire, which lies in close proximity to several sites of political and religious significance, including Hampton Court Palace and Windsor Castle.

Several individuals have been proposed as the model for the song. Simon Symonds was vicar of Bray in 1522–51, during the reigns of Henry VIII and Edward VI. However the candidate favoured by church historian Thomas Fuller and dramatist Richard Brome was Simon Aleyn, vicar of Bray in 1557–65, during the reigns of Mary I and Elizabeth I. Although the song alludes to events of the 17th and 18th centuries, it could be that Bray had already developed a tradition of clerical 'realpolitik' and religious pliability as defence against the turbulence of Tudor religious upheavals.

The candidate whose lifespan and career clearly correspond with the well-known lyrics is Francis Carswell, vicar of Bray for 42 years, 1667–1709, during the reigns of Charles II, James II, William III and Mary II and Anne. Carswell "was of like easy conscience" to his antecedents and remained vicar of Bray until his "dying day", through most of the events described, except the accession of the first Hanoverian king George I alluded to in the final verse. It would not be surprising if, as the song grew in popularity, an additional verse was appended to make it relevant during the mid-18th-century and beyond.

Thomas Barlow has also been suggested as an inspiration for the song, but this may just be because he had a prominent clerical and academic career spanning the vicissitudes alluded to. His career did not extend into the reigns of Queen Anne or George I as implied by the lyrics.

Sources
 Source for the version of the song given here is The British Musical Miscellany, Volume I, 1734, as found in R. S. Crane, A Collection of English Poems 1660–1800, New York: Harper & Row, 1932.
A more thorough annotation, which partially informed this one.
Another annotation
Yet another annotation
Historical background of the song
Midi file of the song

References 

Folk ballads
British folk songs
18th-century songs
History of Berkshire
Bray, Berkshire
Culture in Berkshire
Satirical songs